Empress Alexandra may refer to:

Alexandra Feodorovna (Charlotte of Prussia) (1798–1860), wife of Emperor Nicholas I
Alexandra of Denmark (1844–1925), wife of King-Emperor Edward VII
Alexandra Feodorovna (Alix of Hesse) (1872–1918), wife of Emperor Nicholas II